Bergen is a surname. Some Mennonite Bergen families immigrated to Russia when Catherine the Great of Russia issued a Manifesto in 1763 inviting all Europeans to come and settle various pieces of land within Russia, especially in the Volga River region.

Notable persons with this surname include:
 Hans Hansen Bergen, The progrenator of the Bergens in NY NJ and one of the first Norwegian emigrants to the us.

 Beverley Bergen, New Zealand soprano opera singer
 Bob Bergen (born 1964), American voice actor
 Candice Bergen (born 1946), American actress and model
 Candice Bergen (born 1964), Canadian federal politician
 Bill Bergen (1878–1943), American baseball player
 Edgar Bergen (1903–1978), American actor and radio performer
 Frances Bergen (1922–2006), American actress and model
 Fanny Dickerson Bergen (1846 – 1924), an American folklorist, ethnobiologist and author
 Helen Corinne Bergen (1868 - ?), American journalist and author
 John Teunis Bergen (1786–1855), American politician
 Martin Bergen (disambiguation), several persons
 Larisa Bergen (born 1949), Soviet volleyball player
 Peter Bergen (born 1962), British-American journalist
 Polly Bergen (1930–2014), American entertainer
 Stanley S. Bergen Jr. (1929-2019), American university president
 Teunis G. Bergen (1806–1881), American politician
 Todd Bergen, Canadian ice hockey player
 W. R. Bergen, American basketball coach

van/von Bergen
The preposition "of" or "from" is a common part of names in Dutch (Van), German (Von) and related languages.

Notable people whose surnames contain this particle in conjunction with "Bergen" include:
 John S. Van Bergen (1885–1969), American architect
 Nora von Bergen (born 1990), Swiss ice dancer
 Peter A. Van Bergen (1763-1804), American politician
 Steve von Bergen (born 1983), Swiss footballer

See also
 Bergen (disambiguation)

Surnames
German-language surnames
Norwegian-language surnames
Surnames of Norwegian origin